This list of sweet potato cultivars provides some information about varieties and cultivars of sweet potato (Ipomoea batatas). The sweet potato was first domesticated in the Americas more than 5,000 years ago. As of 2013, there are approximately 7,000 sweet potato cultivars. People grow sweet potato in many parts of the world, including New Zealand, Australia, the Philippines, Japan, Hawaii, China, and North America. However, sweet potato is not widely cultivated in Europe.

People breed sweet potatoes mainly either for food (their nutritious storage roots) or for their attractive flowering vines. (The variety 'Vardaman' is grown for both.) The first table below lists sweet potato cultivars grown for their edible roots; the second table lists cultivars bred as ornamental vines. In the first table, the Parentage column briefly explains how the sweet potato cultivar was bred. Sweet potato plants with desirable traits are selectively bred to produce new cultivars.

Sweet potato cultivars differ in many ways. One way people compare them is by the size, shape, and color of the roots. The more orange the flesh of a sweet potato root is, the more nutritious carotene it has. (Humans metabolize carotene into vitamin A.) The skin of a sweet potato root is a different color than the flesh. The biological word for the outer skin is epidermis; the flesh is called the pith or medulla. The first table below has a general description of the color of the root's flesh and skin.

In the mid-20th century, sweet potato growers in the Southern United States began marketing orange-fleshed sweet potatoes as "yams", in an attempt to differentiate them from pale-fleshed sweet potatoes. Even though these growers called their products yams, true yams are significantly different. All sweet potatoes are variations of one species: I. batatas. Yams are any of various tropical species of the genus Dioscorea. A yam tuber is starchier, dryer, and often larger than the storage root of a sweet potato, and the skin is more coarse. This list does not include yams.

Cultivars bred for edible roots

Many of the sweet potato cultivars below were bred at agricultural experiment stations. An agricultural experiment station (AES) is a research center where scientists work to increase the quality and quantity of food production. Agricultural experiment stations are usually operated by a government agency and/or a university.

Cultivars bred for ornamental vines

See also
 Food security
 Lists of cultivars
 Plant breeding
 Staple food

References

Further reading
 

Lists of cultivars
Cultivars